Sir William Armine, 1st Baronet (11 December 1593 – 10 April 1651) was an English politician who sat in the House of Commons at various times between 1621 and 1651. He supported the Parliamentary cause in the English Civil War. (His name was also spelled Airmine, Armin, Armyne and Armyn.)

Background
Armine was the son of William Armyn (MP) of Osgodby, South Kesteven, Lincolnshire and his first wife Martha, daughter of Lord Eure.

Public life
Armine was created a baronet on 28 November 1619 and succeeded to the estates of his father on 22 January 1622. He was elected Member of Parliament for Boston at least in 1624 and possibly in 1621 to replace Sir Thomas Cheek who sat for another seat. In 1625, he was elected MP for Grantham and in 1626 MP for Lincolnshire. He acted as assistant to the managers of the parliamentary impeachment of the Duke of Buckingham in 1626. In 1627, he refused to collect an arbitrary "loan" which the King had attempted to impose on Lincolnshire, and was imprisoned as a result. He was elected MP for Lincolnshire again in 1628 and sat until 1629 when King Charles decided to rule without parliament for eleven years. He was Sheriff of Lincolnshire in 1630 and Sheriff of Huntingdonshire in 1639.

In 1641, Armine was elected MP for Grantham again in the Long Parliament. At the outbreak of the Civil War, he declared for Parliament, and was sent on Parliament's behalf to discuss terms with the King in 1643. He was one of the judges who was elected for the trial of the King in 1649, but refused to sit. He was elected a member of the Council of State in 1649, and was re-elected in 1650 and 1651.

Armine died in 1651 at the age of 57 and was buried at Lavington, otherwise known as Lenton, Lincolnshire, a place adjacent to Osgodby.

Family
Armine married firstly, on 14 December 1619, Elizabeth Hicks, daughter of Sir Michael Hicks of Beverston Castle, Gloucestershire, and of Ruckholte, in Low Leyton, Essex. By her he had children William (1622–1658) who succeeded to the baronetcy, Theophilus (1623–1644) who became a parliamentary colonel in the civil wars and was killed at Pontefract Castle, Michael (1625–1688) who succeeded his brother to the baronetcy, Elizabeth (1621–1679), who married Sir Thomas Style of Wateringbury and Anne (1624–1671), who married Sir Thomas Barnardiston of Ketton, Suffolk.

Armine married secondly, on 28 August 1628, Mary Holcroft, widow of Thomas Holcroft of Vale Royal Abbey (1557–1620) and daughter of Henry Talbot, son of the Earl of Shrewsbury. She was a philanthropist who founded three hospitals, and also took an active interest in missionaries among Native Americans in England's colonies. By her, Sir William had one further child Talbot Armine (born 1630).

References

 
 

1593 births
1651 deaths
Baronets in the Baronetage of England
High Sheriffs of Lincolnshire
High Sheriffs of Cambridgeshire and Huntingdonshire
People from West Lindsey District
English MPs 1624–1625
English MPs 1625
English MPs 1626
English MPs 1628–1629
English MPs 1640–1648
English MPs 1648–1653
People from Grantham